Fife Scottish Omnibuses Ltd, is a bus operating company part of Stagecoach East Scotland based in Dunfermline, Scotland.

History
Stagecoach Fife can be traced back to 1909 and after buyout and mergers become part of Walter Alexander & Sons. In 1961 Walter Alexander & Sons was split into three separate companies with the Fife operations becoming Alexanders (Fife) with the colour Mason's ayres red to be used as the main fleet colour.

Scottish Bus Group was prepared for deregulation of the bus industry in 1986, and eventual privatisation, which resulted in Fife Scottish Omnibuses Ltd being created. Of the seven original SBG subsidiaries, Alexanders (Fife) was the only company to survive the reorganisation intact; it lost none of its operating area to any of the new companies formed and nor did it gain.  The only impact of the shake-up was the legal name change.

On its creation, the company kept the vibrant red and cream livery adopted by Alexander's Fife operations.  The SBG corporate 'Fife Scottish' fleet name style was adopted, however, in an unusually large size, and larger areas of cream were the only visible differences.  Some vehicles sported Best Bus In The Kingdom slogans as part of SBG's marketing drive, rather than Best Bus In Town or Best Bus Around; playing on Fife's proud history of once being a separate kingdom.

With the arrival of deregulation came the arrival of competition.  Fife had previously enjoyed being the sole operator throughout much of the region and its response to the new operators showed the company's intention to remain so. Despite the cities of Edinburgh and Dundee being on the edges of its operating area, Fife concentrated on protecting its home market rather than expanding into the cities to compete against the dominant operators there.  Rennie's of Dunfermline were the first challengers to Fife in and around that town, but by far the largest and most sustained competition came from local coach firm Moffat & Williamson, who built up a substantial network of services throughout much of Fife, mirroring the larger operator's network.  A "bus war" broke out across the region, and vehicles from both operators could be seen nose to tail on services such as that between Dundee and St Andrews.  Fife's passenger base seemed loyal, however, and Rennies would soon withdraw from Dunfermline and Moffat & Williamson would scale back its operations, though retaining pockets of strong competition in the industrialised towns in the south of the region.

Despite the competition, Fife remained the most profitable of the SBG subsidiaries and was seen by potential buyers as the 'jewel in the crown' of the state-owned bus group.  In July 1991, Fife Scottish was purchased by Stagecoach for £9.1m.  The red and cream livery was replaced by the Stagecoach corporate look of red, blue and orange stripes on a white background.  Stagecoach took a much more severe line with Moffat & Williamson, a strategy that drew criticism in the media for being predatory and uncompetitive.  However, it was a strategy that worked.  Moffat & Williamson would withdraw the majority of its competing services and Fife Scottish would once again become the sole operator in much of the kingdom, a position it enjoys today.

Now part of Stagecoach East Scotland, the company now trades as 'Stagecoach in Fife'.

During the 1980s, Fife Scottish provided coaches for Scottish Citylink, mainly from Fife to other destinations in Scotland.  Since privatisation, however, Fife Scottish has built up its own substantial network of express services under the Stagecoach Express banner.

Operation
From its head office, initially in Kirkcaldy, Fife Scottish operated throughout the ancient kingdom of Fife and beyond to Dundee and Edinburgh.  A network of express services also reach as far west as Glasgow.

Stagecoach is the largest operator in the region and is responsible for urban, rural and interurban services in the towns of St Andrews, Dunfermline, Cowdenbeath, Glenrothes, Leven and Kirkcaldy. Stagecoach operate to two park and ride sites in Fife, one at Ferrytoll just off the A90 towards Edinburgh, and the newly opened Halbeath Park & Ride, located off the A92 at Halbeath, which opened in November 2013 and has departures for Edinburgh, Glasgow, and Fife, as well as the Forth Valley Royal Hospital.

Routes
Stagecoach Fife has four Flagship routes:
 Services 19, 19A & 19B, running at a frequency of every 10 minutes from 7 am to 7 pm, every 20 minutes on Sundays and every 30 minutes during the evenings. The route runs from Rosyth to Dunfermline, Cowdenbeath, Lochgelly & Ballingry. 
 Service 99 operates a 8-minute frequency during the day between St Andrews, Leuchars and Dundee.
 39/39A (via Thornton) which provide a 15-minute service between Kirkcaldy, Thornton & Glenrothes, serving the new entrance to the Victoria Hospital 
 747: Edinburgh Airport to Ferrytoll and Halbeath Park and Rides.

From 2006 service 747 was introduced, which brought a new link between Dunfermline, Inverkeithing & Ferrytoll Park & Ride to Edinburgh Airport, South Gyle & Riccarton, and it was originally branded as "Airdirect" but since January 2011 the service was called "Jet 747". In 2010, the company introduced a new service, Route X42, in partnership with Fife Council to help provide a direct link between Kirkcaldy and Ninewells Hospital, via Glenrothes, Ladybank, Cupar and Dundee City Centre. This service has been replaced by services X54 and X58

Current Depots
 Aberhill (Methilhaven Road)
 Dunfermline (St Leonards Road).  Former Dunfermline & District Tramways tram depot.
 Glenrothes (Flemington Road)
 St Andrews (City Road).  Depot adjacent to bus station.

Former Depots
 Aberhill (Wellesley Road). Former Wemyss & District Tramways tram depot, replaced by the current Aberhill (Methilhaven Road) depot.  The former depot is now East Fife Indoor Bowling Club.
 Anstruther (Pittenweem Road). Closed 1981, building was then used by Fife Council roads department, until they moved out in 2007, building demolished, undeveloped.
 Cowdenbeath (Broad Street).  Former Dunfermline & District Tramways tram depot. Closed August 2015, due to Fife Council services tendered to other operators. Now used by Rennies (Owned by Stagecoach In Fife)
 Cupar (Crossgate).  Closed 1981, site redeveloped as an Argos Extra store.  Until 1996 some buses from St Andrews depot were outstationed overnight in the town centre car park.
 Dunfermline (Market Street). Smaller second depot in town centre which closed in the 1960s. The area has been redeveloped and it now occupied by Halfords, Carnegie Drive Retail Park. Subsequently the street outside the bus station from 1985 until 2007 was also known as Market Street, but this was not in the same location.
 Gallatown Works (Oswald Road).  Former Kirkcaldy Corporation Tramways tram depot, subsequently used as a central maintenance works until replaced by additional facilities at Esplanade.  Building demolished during the 1980s and the site was redeveloped as an industrial unit.
 Kelty (Oakfield St). Closed 1978.  This was the last Fife depot to go over to one person operation in 1977. Home of the famous Kelty Clippies, site demolished 2005, houses stand on site.
 Kirkcaldy (Esplanade).  Formerly the company's headquarters and largest depot, but closed in 2004 in favour of expansion of Aberhill and Glenrothes depots.  The central maintenance works on the opposite side of the road closed in the 1990s, and both sites have been cleared.
 Lochgelly (Auchterderran Road).  Closed 1982, site redeveloped as houses.
 Newburgh (The Shore).  Closed 1990s.  Building now used by a bus and coach repair business and for boat storage.

See also
 List of bus operators of the United Kingdom

References

'Fife Buses: From Alexanders (Fife) to Stagecoach' by Walter Burt.

External links
Stagecoach in Fife website
history of fife Scottish
Halbeath Park & Ride

Transport in Fife
Stagecoach Group bus operators in Scotland